Argyrodes nephilae is a species of cobweb spider in the family Theridiidae. It is found in a range from the United States to Argentina and the Galapagos Islands.

References

External links

 

Theridiidae
Articles created by Qbugbot
Spiders described in 1873